Pedro Agustin Vera Britez (born 20 April 1984) is a Paraguayan footballer.

He played for then Primera División de Chile club Rangers as central midfielder.

Club career
He began his football career at Libertad, but after of not have continuity in that club, he joined General Caballero in June 2005. After a spell at 2 de Mayo, he played at Ecuador with Macará and Técnico Universitario in 2007 and 2008, respectively. In January 2009, he signed for Brazilian Série A club Vasco da Gama, after he had a short spell in 12 de Octubre.

Vera joined to Primera División de Chile club Cobreloa in June 2011, for play at the Torneo Clausura. In the team managed by the former Chile national football team coach Nelson Acosta, he was a key player in the runner-up earned by the club, after losing in the final against Universidad de Chile.

Honours

Club
Cobreloa
 Primera División de Chile (1): Runner-up 2011 Clausura

References

External links
 Pedro Vera at Football Lineups
 BDFA Profile

1984 births
Living people
Paraguayan footballers
Paraguayan expatriate footballers
Club Libertad footballers
Club Olimpia footballers
Cobreloa footballers
C.D. Técnico Universitario footballers
CR Vasco da Gama players
Chilean Primera División players
Expatriate footballers in Brazil
Expatriate footballers in Chile
Expatriate footballers in Ecuador
Association football midfielders